The 2007 European Rowing Championships were held at the Lake Malta in Poznań, Poland, between 21 and 23 September 2007. The European Rowing Championships had previously been held between 1893 and 1973, had become an international regatta in character, and were disestablished when the World Rowing Championships became an annual event. After a decision made in May 2006 by FISA, the European Championships were re-established with a focus on Europe only.

Medal summary

Men

Women

Medal table

References

External links 
 Results

2007 in rowing
Rowing competitions in Poland
2007
Rowing
Sport in Poznań
21st century in Poznań